The 2013 Shanghai Challenger was a professional tennis tournament played on hard courts. It was the third edition of the tournament which was part of the 2013 ATP Challenger Tour. It took place in Shanghai, China between 2 and 8 September 2013.

Singles main-draw entrants

 1 Rankings are as of August 26, 2013.

Other entrants
The following players received wildcards into the singles main draw:
  Bai Yan
  Ouyang Bowen
  Wang Chieh-fu
  Wang Chuhan

The following players received entry from the qualifying draw:
  Toshihide Matsui
  Nam Ji-sung
  Yasutaka Uchiyama
  Zhang Zhizhen

The following players received entry as a lucky loser the singles main draw:
  Wang Riukai

Champions

Singles

 Yūichi Sugita def.  Hiroki Moriya 6–3, 6–3

Doubles

 Sanchai Ratiwatana /  Sonchat Ratiwatana def.  Lee Hsin-han /  Peng Hsien-yin 6–3, 6–4

External links

Shanghai Challenger
Shanghai Challenger
Shanghai Challenger